Battledragon (1995) is a fantasy novel written by Christopher Rowley. The book is the fourth in the Dragons of the Argonath series that follows the adventures of a human boy, Relkin, and his dragon, Bazil Broketail as they fight in the Argonath Legion’s 109th Marneri Dragons.

Plot summary 
The Masters of Padmasa have started using a great new terror on the world of Ryetelth, not magic but technology; on the southern continent of Eigo they have begun building cannons that could break the military might of the Argonathi Dragon Legions. To help fight this new threat, the Argonath Empire enlists the aid of western kingdom of Czardha and their horse mounted armored knights. On the southern continent the combined armies find victory when they destroy the enemies’ cannons and factory, but at a very high price for the armies are nearly devastated. In pursuit of the Master Heruta they track him to his lair inside a volcano that erupts during the final battle. Bazil and Relkin survive, but are separated from the rest of the Legion in a strange land full of magic and terror.

1995 American novels
Novels by Christopher Rowley
American fantasy novels
Roc Books books